"Pilot" is the first episode of the American sitcom television series Abbott Elementary. It was written by series creator and star Quinta Brunson, and was directed by Randall Einhorn. It premiered on the American Broadcasting Company (ABC) in the United States on December 7, 2021.

The episode sees the introduction of the primary school teachers portrayed by Brunson, Tyler James Williams, Chris Perfetti, Lisa Ann Walter and Sheryl Lee Ralph, with Janelle James portraying Principal Coleman at the poorly-funded Willard R. Abbott Elementary, a fictional predominantly Black school in Philadelphia. The pilot has achieved numerous awards and nominations for its writing, directing and acting by the ensemble cast.

Plot 
Janine Teagues (Quinta Brunson) reveals that she has been teaching at Abbott Elementary for a year and, although she is proud to have survived the Philadelphia school system, her main problem is the school's lack of money. When Janine's student Jamal pees on the classroom rug, Janine is forced to remove the rug. She tries to get her students to sit down to no avail, until Kindergarten teacher Barbara Howard (Sheryl Lee Ralph), a senior teacher at Abbott, gets them to sit down easily.

In the teachers' lounge, Janine tells them that she needs a rug, and it turns out that both Jacob Hill (Chris Perfetti) and Melissa Schemmenti (Lisa Ann Walter) need one too. The school's principal, Ava Coleman (Janelle James), walks in and asks the teachers what they think about the camera crew she brought into the school, to which Melissa replies that it's "distracting" and makes their job harder. The teachers are informed that overwhelmed first grade teacher Tina Schwartz (Kate Peterman) kicked a student in the hallway. This incident results in Tina being fired and Ava has Mr. Johnson, the janitor, take over Tina's social studies class.

Later that day, Gregory Eddie (Tyler James Williams) arrives to sub for Ms. Schwartz. The following day, Janine goes to Barbara for her opinion on the rug request email she composed for Ava. Barbara insists that she shouldn't expect anything and to just do her job. Ava then makes an announcement via PA system about some improvements to the school. However, it is revealed that Ava had used the requested budget for a new school sign instead of hiring the much-needed aides and the requested rugs. Janine is indignant and decides to e-mail the superintendent about what Ava has done. However, Barbara and Melissa inform her that the superintendent never receives any of their e-mails and that they are bounced back to the person in charge of where they came from, which is Ava. Ava makes another announcement calling all teachers to a "trust workshop" because one of the teachers disrespected her. There she singles out Janine, but the other teachers refuse to take part in it. Janine tells everyone that she was the one who disrespected Ava and apologizes to everyone. Before she walks out, she explains that she did it because of Ava spending the money on a sign and because she cared about the students. The other teachers follow her out.

Janine shows the other teachers one of her students who is napping on the classroom floor. Barbara suggests that they chip in for a new rug, but Janine tells her that they don't have the money for it, but Melissa uses her contacts to get them new rugs. Janine lays out the new rug in her classroom and her students cheer. Janine is happy that even without help from the higher-ups, she is still able to help her students and the school.

Reception

Viewership 
The episode was viewed by 2.88 million people during its first broadcast on ABC. Including viewership recorded over a 35-day period through "linear and digital platforms" (known as MP35) after its original broadcast, the pilot episode on December 7, 2021, increased to a 2.4 demographic rating, with 7.1 million viewers. ABC said the 300% increase was its "largest percentage growth for any new comedy premiere".

Awards and nominations 
The episode has racked up numerous awards, including Brunson winning the Outstanding Writing, Comedy Series award for writing the pilot at the Black Reel Television Awards. At the Hollywood Critics Association Awards, Brunson won the Best Writing in a Broadcast Network or Cable Series, Comedy award, while Randall Einhorn was nominated for Best Directing in a Broadcast Network or Cable Series, Comedy for his directorial duties in the pilot. At the 74th Primetime Emmy Awards, Brunson won the Outstanding Writing for a Comedy Series for writing the episode.

References 

2021 American television episodes
Abbott Elementary
Abbott Elementary